Andrea Pininfarina (26 June 1957 – 7 August 2008) was an Italian engineer and manager, former CEO of the Italian coachbuilder Pininfarina, founded by his grandfather Battista "Pinin" Farina in 1930 and still controlled by the family. He was the son of Sergio Pininfarina and was married to Italian aristocrat Cristina Maddalena Pellion di Persano, with whom he had three children, Benedetta, Sergio and Luca.

Pininfarina was born in Turin. In 1981 he graduated from Polytechnic of Turin as a mechanical engineer and in 1982 was employed by Fruehauf corporation in the United States of America. In 1983 he joined the family business as Program Manager of the Cadillac Allanté project at Pininfarina. In 1987 he was promoted to Co-General Manager of the company, and in 1988 he became General Manager. In 1994 he was again promoted to Managing Director, and in 2001 he assumed the responsibility of chief executive officer.  Pininfarina briefly served as vice president of Italy's Confindustria industry lobby before his death in 2008.  In 2004 he was named by Businessweek as one of the "25 stars of Europe", in the category dedicated to innovators, while in 2005 he received the Eurostar 2005 award from The Automotive News Europe, awarded to "top managers who have particularly distinguished themselves in the business sectors covered by their respective automotive companies."

Pininfarina died while riding a Vespa near the company’s headquarters in Cambiano outside Turin, Italy, on the morning of 7 August 2008. According to police, a car driven by a 78-year-old man maneuvered from a side street around a parked lorry and pulled directly in front of Pininfarina. Conditions at the time of the accident were very foggy.

References

1957 births
2008 deaths
Polytechnic University of Turin alumni
Italian chief executives
Italian mechanical engineers
Motorcycle road incident deaths
Automotive engineers from Turin
Pininfarina people
Road incident deaths in Italy
21st-century Italian engineers
20th-century Italian engineers